Padmanabhan Palpu LMS, DPH (Cantab) FRIPH (London) (2 November 1863 – 25 January 1950) was the second public health doctor in Travancore and a social revolutionary, who become the chief medical officer of Mysore State. He was a member of the British Medical Council for Virology. Ritty Lukose describes him as the "political father" of the Ezhavas, who are numerically the largest caste in the region now encompassed by the state of Kerala. In 1903, he founded the Sree Narayana Dharma Paripalana Yogam, (Society for the Propagation of the teachings of Sree Narayana) whose first president was Narayana Guru, who sought an end to the caste system and preached his concept of "one caste, one religion, one god."

Life

Early life and education

Padmanabhan Palpu was born on 2 November 1863 in Petta, Trivandrum, then in the Kingdom of Travancore, India. His family were wealthy and educated members of the Ezhava caste. The Ezhavas were traditionally occupied as weavers, farmers and some of them were employed as toddy tappers. In addition to that, many had involvements in agriculture and ayurvedic medicine, and they were also occupied as shopkeepers, astrologists, businessmen and land lords.

Palpu, who had learned English from a Eurasian tutor from the age of 12, attended Maharaja's College in Trivandrum and matriculated there in 1883. He then wrote the examination for admission to medical studies. He was denied the admission though he ranked second. It was common knowledge that his caste-related birth determined the decision, even though the official reason given was that he was beyond the age limit. Like his older brother, he seems to have been able to use his family's association with Christian missionaries to avoid the usual rule in the kingdom that Ezhavas were forbidden from school attendance. He was subsequently refused admission to Travancore Medical College due to his caste. From 1885, he attended a similar college in Madras, which was outside the kingdom, having raised money to do so through subscriptions and taking on debt. His financial situation was dire by the end of the first year, when he received an honour certificate, but he was able to complete the course with the aid of donations he solicited from various high-placed people. These donations were carefully scripted to prevent him from later taking up a position within the government, as Ezhavas were forbidden from such employment and many higher caste doctors would in any event refuse to work with lower caste colleagues. He went to England to further his medical training at London and Cambridge. Back in India and having been awarded his Licentiate in Medicine and Surgery in 1889, he found that his caste status prevented him from obtaining employment in the Travancore Health Service, which meant that he had to relocate to Mysore to get work.

Mysore state service

Palpu later became the chief Medical officer of Mysore state like a minister. His salary was more than the salary of Travancore Diwan. Later he was selected to the British Medical Council for virology. He was the only person from Asia. After the retirement, he was offered the post of Diwan in Baroda, but he refused the offer. . He was able to work for the British there as a public health doctor.

Social activism

Becoming aware of the importance of education as a method of socio-economic advancement and also as means to improve health and hygiene, Palpu was the third signatory to the "Malayali Memorial", a petition organised and submitted to the Maharaja of Travancore on January 1, 1891, that primarily sought to address the concerns of those members of the Nair community and other natives, who were in government jobs but felt that the best of those jobs were dominated by non-Malayali Brahmins. The petition was amended to include a statement on the injustices faced by Ezhavas and was published in the Madras Times in July. Whilst the Memorial had no success, according to Robin Jeffrey it did indicate to Palpu a method by which he could continue to campaign for the improved position of Ezhavas in society. Caroline Wilson notes that he also petitioned the Houses of Parliament while in England.

Palpu was among those who attempted to use data from the 1891 census to highlight inequalities in Travancore society and he again made demands in 1895, when he petitioned the Diwan of Travancore, S. Shungrasoobyer, with a statement explaining the ways in which the Ezhavas suffered discrimination. He noted that if members of the community wanted education or government jobs then their only recourse was to convert from Hinduism to Christianity. Shungrasoobyer was slow in responding but in February 1896, when Palpu had taken leave from his job in Bangalore, Mysore, to press the matter in Trivandrum, he told Palpu that the government would open as many of its schools as possible to Ezhavas and that it would consider applications from qualified Ezhavas for posts in all departments other than Revenue.

In practice, when some Ezhava graduates applied for government jobs soon after Shungrasoobyer's announcement, they were told that there were no vacancies. Thus, later in 1896, Palpu again took leave from his job to campaign in Travancore. He organised a petition that attracted the signatures of 13,176 Ezhavas. This letter was presented to the Maharajah of Travancore and demanded their right to admission in schools run by the colonial government and access to employment in public service. The bar from education in government schools was noted as being inequitable given their claim that the Ezhavas paid more taxes than any other community in the kingdom. The petition was published in the Madras Mail in September of that year. This use of petitions as a vehicle to achieve a coalescence of communal consciousness and cause change was one of the first examples of such in the kingdom, where the ritually superior Brahmin groups held the majority of posts available in the administration of the state.

Palpu influenced the political philosophy of C. Kesavan. He had a son, commonly known as Nataraja Guru.

References

1863 births
1950 deaths
Indian male writers
Malayali people
19th-century Indian medical doctors
Narayana Guru
People from Thiruvananthapuram district
Madras Medical College alumni
20th-century Indian medical doctors
19th-century Indian writers
20th-century Indian writers
Writers from Kerala
Indian bacteriologists
Scientists from Kerala